Knower may refer to:

Knower (duo), American independent electronic music duo
Benjamin Knower (1775–1839), American merchant, banker, and politician
Knower House, historic home in Albany County, New York
 "The Knower" (song), a song by Youth Lagoon

See also 
Knower paradox
 Knowledge (disambiguation)